Benwick Parish Council was established in 1895 by the Local Government Act 1894 covering the civil parish of Benwick, Cambridgeshire, England. It comprises seven councillors, three of which were elected unopposed in May 2015, with the remaining four seats filled by co-option.

Role in the Community
The Parish Council manages the village Cemetery and Allotments as well as an area of land on the High Street known as the Pound. It is responsible for the War Memorial and village Bus Shelter.

References 

Parish councils of England
Local precepting authorities in England
Local authorities in Cambridgeshire
Parish Council